Shane Mattis is a professional goalkeeper from Jamaica who is currently contracted to North East Stars F.C. in the TT Pro League.

Career

Youth

Taught football at the Fairview Open Bible Church in Jamaica, Mattis originally played as a striker but switched to goalkeeper at age 14 as his team was without someone who could play in goal.

Trinidad and Tobago

Involved with a number of Trinidadian clubs, Mattis made two penalty saves in the 2014 First Citizens Cup for San Juan Jabloteh, knocking out Defence Force from the tournament. Also, 
Mattis made another two penalty stops for the same club in the 2014 Trinidad and Tobago Classic final.

After retirement, the Jamaican wants to be a coach.

International
Was called up to the Jamaica national football team in 2004 in what he describes as the apotheosis of his career.

Personal life
Having one son, Mattis sees him as his inspiration to play football.

References

1980 births
Living people
Jamaican expatriate footballers
Association football goalkeepers
Jamaican footballers
Expatriate footballers in Trinidad and Tobago
TT Pro League players
People from Saint Catherine Parish